Medinfar is a Portuguese pharmaceutical company headquartered in Lisbon.

The company has a wide range of products from Prescription Medicines to Generics, OTC/Consumer Health products and veterinary products. Medinfar promotes products in several therapeutic areas as General Practice, Cardiology, Gastroenterology, Respiratory and Dermatology.

History
it was founded in 1970. Medinfar has R&D, Production, Distribution, Marketing and Sales departments, and besides its own brands it markets licensed products in partnerships with several top international pharmaceutical companies.

In 2001, with the acquisition of the contract manufacturing unit, Farmalabor, in Condeixa (Portugal center region), Medinfar increased its productive capacity. This unit has an area of 47,000 m2.
 1970:  Establishment of Medinfar		 			
 2000: Establishment of Medinfar Morocco  
 2001: Acquisition of Farmalabor		
 2005:  Establishment of Cytothera and GP
 2009: Halibut® acquisition

Medinfar Group

 Pharmaceutical Unit:

- Medinfar Farma – Prescription Medicines Marketing & Sales. Main therapeutic areas: Respiratory, Dermatology and Cardiology.

- GP – Genéricos Portugueses – Marketing & Sales of Generic Drugs. Main therapeutic areas: Neurology, Psychiatry, Cardiovascular, Osteoporosis and Urology.

- Medinfar Consumer Health – Promotion and commercialization of non-prescription medicines and other health products. Main therapeutic areas: Cough & Cold, GERD & Heartburn, Antiviral, Asthenia and Vitamins.

 Contract Manufacturing Unit:

- Farmalabor – contract manufacturing unit located in Condeixa, Portugal center region. Farmalabor is certified in accordance with Good Manufacturing Practices (GMP) and cGMP, GLP, ISO 9001:2008, ISO 14001:2004 and OHSAS 18001. Farmalabor has more than 40 national and international clients and manufactures solid forms (tablets, coated tablets, capsules, pellets, granules, sachets, suppositories) semi-solid forms (creams, ointments) and liquid forms (solutions, suspensions, syrups).

 Veterinary  Business Unit:

- Medinfar Sorológico – Veterinaty drugs, devices and Herd vaccines. Main therapeutic areas and products: Anesthetics, Antibiotics, fluid therapy, Multivitamin & Iron and Shampoos.

Biotechnology Unit:

- Cytothera – First company in Europe processing and cryopreserving umbilical cord tissue stem cells.

Medinfar in the world

As a result of its globalization challenge, Medinfar Group is present in more than 40 countries around the world, through its affiliate in Morocco and distributors throughout Europe, FWA, PALOP, Middle East and Asia.

External links
Official website

Pharmaceutical companies of Portugal
Companies based in Lisbon
Portuguese brands
Generic drug manufacturers